Arnold Gedye (23 February 1887 – 31 December 1976) was a New Zealand cricketer. He played in two first-class matches for Wellington in 1919/20.

See also
 List of Wellington representative cricketers

References

External links
 

1887 births
1976 deaths
New Zealand cricketers
Wellington cricketers
Cricketers from Auckland